Gidgegannup is a township  northeast of Perth, the capital city of Western Australia. The name Gidgegannup comes from a Noongar word meaning "Place where spears are made", and was first recorded by passing surveyors in 1852.

The townsite is situated on Toodyay Road. The locality is drained by the north flowing Wooroloo and Gidgegannup Brooks.  Due to low density development, considerable amounts of natural vegetation remain in the area - and the roads to the north of Toodyay road (O'Brien, Clenton and Berry, and Reen Roads) have been designated Wildflower Scenic Drive.

The Gidgegannup Agricultural Society has held over 60 shows at the Gidgegannup showgrounds.

Population 
In the 2016 Australian census, there were 2,743 people in Gidgegannup. 71.8% of people were born in Australia. The next most common country of birth was England at 9.6%. The most common responses for religion were No Religion 37.9%, Anglican 20.4% and Catholic 15.9%.

Localities 
Gidgegannup has several official and non-official localities of note.

 Tilden Park
 Hampton Estate
 Paruna (Birkner Estate)
 Noble Falls

References

External links 
 Gidgegannup Community Website

Suburbs of Perth, Western Australia
Suburbs and localities in the City of Swan
Bushfire affected towns in Western Australia